Gardena is a city located in the South Bay region of Los Angeles County, California, United States. The population was 58,829 at the 2010 census, up from 57,746 at the 2000 census. Until 2014, the US census cited the City of Gardena as the place with the highest percentage of Japanese Americans in California. Gardena's Japanese American population contributes to the South Bay region of Los Angeles being home to the largest concentration of Japanese companies within the mainland United States.

History

Based on archaeological findings, the Tongva people hunted and fished in the area of today's Gardena. The Tongva Indians — also known as Gabrielino Indians — are probably descendants of those who crossed from Asia to North America around 10,000 years ago.

In 1784, three years after the foundation of Los Angeles, Juan Jose Dominguez (1736–1809), a Spanish soldier who arrived in San Diego, California in 1769 with Fernando Rivera y Moncada, in recognition of his military service, received the roughly  Spanish land grant, the Rancho San Pedro.  Part of this land contained what became known as Gardena Valley. After the American Civil War veterans bought parts of the land, and soon ranchers and farmers followed suit. Union Army Major General William Starke Rosecrans in 1869 bought . The "Rosecrans Rancho" was bordered by what later was Florence Avenue on the north, Redondo Beach Boulevard on the south, Central Avenue on the east, and Arlington Avenue on the west. The Rosecrans property was subdivided and sold in the early 1870s. One of those became the  Amestoy Ranch.  Gardena proper began in 1887 when the Pomeroy & Harrison real estate developers subdivided the ranch, anticipating the coming of the Los Angeles and Redondo Railway. Civil War veteran Spencer Roane Thorpe is credited with starting the first settlement in Gardena in 1887.  Railroads put Gardena on the map following a real estate boom in the Los Angeles area in the 1880s.

Some believe the city was named for its reputation for being the only "green spot" in the dry season between Los Angeles and the sea.  Because of its acres of berries, the city was dubbed "Berryland". The Strawberry Day Festival and Parade was held each May. The berry industry suffered at the time of World War I as other crops were supported by the war economy.

Japanese Americans settled in Gardena throughout its history. The only way Gardena could protect itself from a heavy county tax imposed on a planned project at a park site was to incorporate. The City of Gardena became incorporated on September 11, 1930.

From 1936 to 1980, Gardena held a local monopoly on legal cardrooms, the taxes from which accounted for nearly a third of its annual budget. As this Los Angeles suburb grew, many Japanese American families moved into the new tract homes being built.

Geography
A  wetland preserve, the Gardena Willows Wetland Preserve, is located at the southeast corner of Gardena. This is a naturally occurring marshland where water seeps above-ground all year round. It hosts several species of trees and other vegetation.

Gardena is bordered by the unincorporated community of Athens on the north, the Los Angeles neighborhood of Harbor Gateway on the east and south, Torrance on the southwest, Alondra Park on the west, and Hawthorne on the northwest.

Neighborhoods in Gardena include:
Hermosillo
Moneta
Strawberry Park

Demographics

2010
The 2010 United States Census reported that Gardena had a population of 58,829. The racial makeup of Gardena was 14,498 (24.6%) White (9.3% Non-Hispanic White), 14,352 (24.4%) African American, 348 (0.6%) Native American, 15,400 (26.2%) Asian, 426 (0.7%) Pacific Islander, 11,136 (18.9%) from other races, and 2,669 (4.5%) from two or more races. There were 22,151 people of Hispanic or Latino origin, of any race (37.7%).

The Census reported that 58,035 people (98.7% of the population) lived in households, 122 (0.2%) lived in non-institutionalized group quarters, and 672 (1.1%) were institutionalized.

There were 20,558 households, out of which 7,199 (35.0%) had children under the age of 18 living in them, 8,782 (42.7%) were opposite-sex married couples living together, 3,931 (19.1%) had a female householder with no husband present, 1,486 (7.2%) had a male householder with no wife present. There were 1,085 (5.3%) unmarried opposite-sex partnerships, and 104 (0.5%) same-sex married couples or partnerships. 5,142 households (25.0%) were made up of individuals, and 1,921 (9.3%) had someone living alone who was 65 years of age or older. The average household size was 2.82. There were 14,199 families (69.1% of all households); the average family size was 3.39.

The population was spread out, with 13,410 people (22.8%) under the age of 18, 5,353 people (9.1%) aged 18 to 24, 16,656 people (28.3%) aged 25 to 44, 15,086 people (25.6%) aged 45 to 64, and 8,324 people (14.1%) who were 65 years of age or older. The median age was 37.9 years. For every 100 females, there were 92.6 males.  For every 100 females age 18 and over, there were 89.8 males.

The homeowner vacancy rate was 1.3%; the rental vacancy rate was 4.6%.  28,585 people (48.6% of the population) lived in owner-occupied housing units and 29,450 people (50.1%) lived in rental housing units.

During 2009–2013, Gardena had a median household income of $48,251, with 15.5% of the population living below the federal poverty line.

2000
As of the census of 2000, there were 57,746 people, 20,324 households, and 14,023 families residing in the city. The population density was 9,921.3 inhabitants per square mile (3,830.9/km2). The racial makeup of the city was 23.82% White, 25.99% Black or African American, 0.64% Native American, 26.82% Asian, 0.73% Pacific Islander, 16.94% from other races, and 5.05% from two or more races. 31.82% of the population were Hispanic or Latino of any race.

There were 20,324 households, out of which 33.5% had children under the age of 18 living with them, 44.5% were married couples living together, 18.1% had a female householder with no husband present, and 31.0% were non-families. 25.5% of all households were made up of individuals, and 8.2% had someone living alone who was 65 years of age or older. The average household size was 2.80 and the average family size was 3.38.

In the city, the population was spread out, with 25.8% under the age of 18, 8.7% from 18 to 24, 32.3% from 25 to 44, 20.9% from 45 to 64, and 12.4% who were 65 years of age or older. The median age was 34 years. For every 100 females, there were 95.1 males. For every 100 females age 18 and over, there were 91.4 males.

The median income for a household in the city was $38,988, and the median income for a family was $44,906. Males had a median income of $32,951 versus $29,908 for females. The per capita income for the city was $17,263. About 12.3% of families and 15.7% of the population were below the poverty line, including 22.3% of those under age 18 and 10.1% of those age 65 or over.

1980
In 1980, about 31% of the population was Anglo white, 23% was black, 21% was Japanese, and 17% was Latino. The remainder included a Korean community that was increasing in size and Chinese, Filipino, and Native American people. The National Planning Data Corp. released projected figures in 1987 estimating that of the 50,000 residents, 26.3% were Anglo, 23% were black, 22.7 were Latino, and 28% were of other racial groups. By 1989, Anglo and Japanese residents tended to live in central and southern Gardena. Middle class black people began to move into the Hollypark area in northern Gardena in the 1960s, so the black population was concentrated there.

1970–1978
According to the 1970 U.S. Census, 56% of the population was White. Racial demographic changes occurred until 1978. That year, Mayor Edmond J. Russ declared that, according to a special 1978 census, the racial demographics of Gardena had stabilized.

Japanese Americans

Gardena has a large Japanese-American community.  Until 2014, it had the second-highest concentration of Japanese Americans in any U.S. municipality, the first being Honolulu. As of 2014, the nearby city of Torrance holds the highest Japanese-American population in the 48 contiguous states.

The Japanese Cultural Institute (JCI) has been is located in Gardena since 1988, and offers cultural and social activities for Japanese Americans. The building used during that year was completed in 1976.

Early in Gardena's history, Japanese migrants played a role in the agrarian economy. The Japanese Association founded the Moneta Japanese Institute in 1911, and the Parents' Association founded the Gardena Japanese School in 1916. Beginning in the 1920s, Japanese American organizations, including the Moneta Gakuen, were established continuously around the current JCI site. The Moneta Gakuen operated a school until the World War II internment.

In 1942 the U.S. military moved the Japanese in Gardena to internment camps.

In 1966, for the first time, a Nisei, Kiyoto Ken Nakaoka, was seated on the city council.

Korean Americans

, about 60% of the Korean population in the South Bay region lived in Gardena and Torrance. By that year, many Korean businesses had been established in Gardena because its commercial land was more affordable than that of Torrance, a middle-class base, and it also had an established Asian population. In 1990, 2,857 ethnic Koreans lived in Gardena, a 209% increase from the 1980 figure of 924 ethnic Koreans.

Economy
Digital Manga is headquartered in Suite 300 at 1487 West 178th Street. Nissin Foods has its United States headquarters and a plant in Gardena. Nissin Foods (U.S.A.) Co., Inc. opened in Gardena in 1970. Marukai Corporation U.S.A. has its headquarters in Gardena. Nissan's North America headquarters were located in Gardena until they moved to Tennessee in 2006.

National Stores Inc., which operates the Factory 2-U and the Fallas Paredes brands, has its headquarters in the Harbor Gateway area of Los Angeles, near Gardena.

Top employers
According to the city's 2012 Comprehensive Annual Financial Report, the top employers in the city are:

Government

Education

Primary and secondary schools
The Los Angeles Unified School District operates the city's public schools.

Zoned middle schools include:
 Peary Middle School
 Some areas in Gardena have a choice between Peary and Henry Clay Middle School. (Los Angeles)
Peary Middle school has two campuses that are connected by a bridge. One side holds classes only for 6th graders while the other containing the large field and cafeteria holds classes for the 7th and 8th graders. The primary reasoning of the splitting of grade levels in this way is to prevent bullying from older students. Peary Middle school also has a program for gifted and magnet students. Students from the magnet program are separated from the rest of the school and takes special classes with magnet teachers.

Zoned high schools include:
 Gardena High School (Los Angeles)

In the spring of 1956, the junior high school classes stayed at the old Gardena High School while the high school classes moved into a new building. Up until the opening of the new Gardena High School, high school students held morning shifts, while junior high school students held afternoon shifts.

The northern end of the Gardena HS campus has LAUSD staff housing, Sage Park Apartments.

Private schools
The Roman Catholic Archdiocese of Los Angeles operates Catholic schools in Gardena, including Junípero Serra High School, Maria Regina Catholic School (K-8), and St. Anthony of Padua School (K-8). Gardena Valley Christian School, a K-8 non-Catholic private school, is in Gardena. The Gardena Christian Academy, a PreK-2 Christian school, is in Gardena.

Infrastructure

Public services
The Gardena Office of Economic Development is a department of the city government. It aids employers in filling a variety of jobs customized to their specific needs. It also helps potential employers in setting up business enterprises.

The Gardena Police Department is the primary law enforcement agency in the city. The department has 89 sworn police officers, 24 full-time support staff, and 33 part-time employees. There are reserve, volunteer, and explorer programs. The current Chief of Police is Michael Saffell, appointed in 2020. Radio communications and the 9-1-1 call center are handled by the South Bay Regional Public Communications Authority.

The Los Angeles County Department of Health Services operates the Curtis Tucker Health Center in Inglewood and the Torrance Health Center in Harbor Gateway, Los Angeles, near Torrance and serving Gardena.

The United States Postal Service operates the Gardena Post Office at 1455 West Redondo Beach Boulevard, the South Gardena Post Office at 1103 West Gardena Boulevard, and the Alondra Post Office at 14028 Van Ness Avenue.

Libraries
Gardena Mayme Dear Library, a  building located in Gardena, and Masao W. Satow Library, located west of Gardena in Alondra Park (El Camino Village), unincorporated Los Angeles County, are operated by the County of Los Angeles Public Library.

Wednesday Progressive Club sponsored the formation of the Gardena Library. In 1913 the Moneta Branch was formed. In 1914 the Gardena Library became a part of the Los Angeles County Free Library system. Due to annexation the library was transferred to the Los Angeles City Library Board. In 1919 the Strawberry Park branch was formed. In August 1951 the Gardena library came back to the county system. In 1958 the Strawberry Park and Moneta branches merged into the West Gardena Branch. The current Gardena library building was dedicated on December 5, 1964. In 1969 a fire forced the West Gardena branch to go to a new location. The current Satow building, dedicated on February 26, 1977, was named after a Japanese American in the community. The Gardena library received its current name on May 30, 1992, and was named after a library volunteer, who had died prior to the renaming.

Transportation

The city operates the GTrans bus services (formerly as Gardena Municipal Bus Lines).

The National Transportation Safety Board operates the Gardena Aviation Field Office in Harbor Gateway, Los Angeles; it is the regional headquarters of the NTSB Aviation Western Region.

Notable people

 J.C. Agajanian, prominent racing promoter; owned and operated Ascot Park
 Paul Bannai, former city councilman and first Japanese American to serve in the California State Legislature
 Romana Acosta Bañuelos, 34th and first Hispanic US Treasurer; founder/owner of Ramona's Mexican Food Products, one of the oldest businesses still operating in the city
 Beau Bennett, retired hockey player born in Gardena who was the highest-drafted hockey player of all-time to be born and trained in California
 Polly Bergen, actress and singer; lived in Gardena and attended Gardena High School
 Gary Berland, professional poker player; won five World Series of Poker bracelets; born and raised in Gardena
 Ron Block, banjo player, guitarist and singer-songwriter
 Steven Bradford, 1978 Gardena High School graduate; first African American elected to the Gardena City Council (1997–2009); former California Assemblyman (2009–2014)
 Enos Cabell, third baseman with the Baltimore Orioles and Detroit Tigers; attended Gardena High School
 Wayne Collett, runner, 1972 Summer Olympics silver medalist in the 400 meter event; attended Gardena High School
 Dock Ellis, pitcher with the Pittsburgh Pirates; attended Gardena High School
 Charlie Evans, running back with the New York Giants and Washington Redskins; born in Gardena
 Robert L. Freedman, screenwriter and playwright; former resident of Gardena
 Glen Fukushima, former Deputy Assistant US Trade Representative for Japan and China, 1988-1990
 Gaston Green, running back with the Los Angeles Rams and Denver Broncos; attended Gardena High School
 H.B. Halicki, actor, filmmaker, stuntman; business owner in Gardena and premiered his Gone in 60 Seconds there in 1974
 Juaquin Hawkins, professional basketball player; played with the Houston Rockets during the 2002-2003 NBA season
 Lisa Leslie, Olympic gold medalist and Los Angeles Sparks basketball player; born in Gardena 
 Butch Patrick, actor; was living in Gardena and attending PAE when he auditioned for The Munsters
 Art Pepper, innovative jazz saxophonist; born in Gardena
 Paul Petersen, actor, novelist, activist; former resident of Gardena
 William Rosecrans, Union general, congressman, and ambassador to Mexico; owner of and resident upon (from 1869) "Rosecrans Rancho," the foundation upon which Gardena later emerged
 Kevin A. Ross, host of America's Court with Judge Ross; attended Gardena High School and served as the school's student body president
 Daewon Song, professional skateboarder; resident of Gardena
 George Stanich, high jumper and bronze medalist of the 1948 Summer Olympics; resident of Gardena
Paul Tanaka, Mayor and council-member
 Tyga, rapper; attended Gardena High School
 Billy Warlock, actor
 Robert Woods, Los Angeles Rams wide receiver

Sister cities 
  Huatabampo, Mexico
  Ichikawa, Japan

See also

 Gardena Municipal Bus Lines
 South Bay, Los Angeles
 Ascot Park, a closed racetrack in Gardena

References

Further reading
 Williams, Bob. "Gardena Goes Its Way, Successfully ." Los Angeles Times. August 16, 1984. South Bay p. SB1. 
 Yoshinaga, George. "HORSE’S MOUTH: Where to Eat in Gardena."  Rafu Shimpo. Wednesday August 21, 2013.

External links

 
 Jobs and business: Gardena Economic Development

 
Cities in Los Angeles County, California
Incorporated cities and towns in California
South Bay, Los Angeles
Japanese-American culture in California
Korean-American culture in California
1930 establishments in California
Populated places established in 1930